Guavate is a barrio in the municipality of Cayey, Puerto Rico. Its population in 2010 was 1,870.

History
Puerto Rico was ceded by Spain in the aftermath of the Spanish–American War under the terms of the Treaty of Paris of 1898 and became an unincorporated territory of the United States. In 1899, the United States Department of War conducted a census of Puerto Rico finding that the combined population of Beatriz and Guavate barrios was 853.

Tourism
Guavate is known for its "pork highway" (a stretch of Puerto Rico Highway 184) and was featured in the Discover Puerto Rico tourism campaign of 2019 for being a must-see place in Puerto Rico because of its tender pork cuisine, mild weather and scenic views of Sierra de Cayey. The Carite State Forest is located nearby.

Notable residents
Juan Santos Torres  is a well-known Puerto Rican sculptor who lives in and has a workshop in Guavate.

Gallery

See also

 List of communities in Puerto Rico

References

Barrios of Cayey, Puerto Rico